Serpents are referred to in both the Hebrew Bible and the New Testament. The symbol of a serpent or snake played important roles in the religious traditions and cultural life of ancient Greece, Egypt, Mesopotamia, and Canaan. The serpent was a symbol of evil power and chaos from the underworld as well as a symbol of fertility, life, healing, and rebirth.

Nāḥāš, Hebrew for "snake", is also associated with divination, including the verb form meaning "to practice divination or fortune-telling". Nāḥāš occurs in the Torah to identify the serpent in the Garden of Eden. Throughout the Hebrew Bible, it is also used in conjunction with seraph to describe vicious serpents in the wilderness. The tannin, a dragon monster, also occurs throughout the Hebrew Bible. In the Book of Exodus, the staves of Moses and Aaron are turned into serpents, a nāḥāš for Moses, a tannin for Aaron. In the New Testament, the Book of Revelation makes use of ancient serpent and the Dragon several times to identify Satan or the Devil. The serpent is most often identified with the hubristic Satan, and sometimes with Lilith.

The narrative of the Garden of Eden and the fall of humankind constitute a mythological tradition shared by all the Abrahamic religions, with a presentation more or less symbolic of Judeo-Christian morals and religious beliefs, which had an overwhelming impact on human sexuality, gender roles, and sex differences both in the Western and Islamic civilizations. In mainstream (Nicene) Christianity, the doctrine of the Fall is closely related to that of original sin or ancestral sin. Unlike Christianity, the other major Abrahamic religions, Judaism and Islam, do not have a concept of "original sin", and instead have developed varying other interpretations of the Eden narrative.

Serpents in Mesopotamian mythology

In one of the oldest stories ever written, the Epic of Gilgamesh, the main character and eponymous protagonist Gilgamesh loses the power of immortality, stolen by a snake. The serpent was a widespread figure in the mythologies of the Ancient Near East and Eastern Mediterranean. Ouroboros is an ancient symbol of a serpent eating its own tail that represents the perpetual cyclic renewal of life, the eternal return, and the cycle of life, death, and rebirth, leading to immortality.

Archaeologists have uncovered serpent cult objects in Bronze Age strata at several pre-Israelite cities in Canaan: two at Tel Megiddo, one at Gezer, one in the sanctum sanctorum of the Area H temple at Hazor, and two at Shechem. In the surrounding region, a late Bronze Age Hittite shrine in northern Syria contained a bronze statue of a god holding a serpent in one hand and a staff in the other. In sixth-century Babylon, a pair of bronze serpents flanked each of the four doorways of the temple of Esagila. At the Babylonian New Year festival, the priest was to commission from a woodworker, a metalworker and a goldsmith two images one of which "shall hold in its left hand a snake of cedar, raising its right [hand] to the god Nabu". At the tell of Tepe Gawra, at least seventeen Early Bronze Age Assyrian bronze serpents were recovered.<ref>E.A. Speiser, Excavations at Tepe Gawra: I. Levels I-VIII, p. 114ff., noted in Joines 1968:246 and note 9.</ref> The Sumerian fertility god Ningizzida was sometimes depicted as a serpent with a human head, eventually becoming a god of healing and magic.

Hebrew Bible

In the Hebrew Bible, the Book of Genesis refers to a serpent who triggered the expulsion of Adam and Eve from the Garden in Eden. Serpent is also used to describe sea monsters. Examples of these identifications are in the Book of Isaiah where a reference is made to a serpent-like dragon named Leviathan, and in the Book of Amos where a serpent resides at the bottom of the sea. Serpent figuratively describes biblical places such as Egypt, and the city of Dan. The prophet Jeremiah also compares the King of Babylon to a serpent.

Eden

The Hebrew word נָחָשׁ (Nāḥāš) is used in the Hebrew Bible to identify the serpent that appears in Genesis , in the Garden of Eden. In the first book of the Torah, the serpent is portrayed as a deceptive creature or trickster, who promotes as good what God had forbidden and shows particular cunning in its deception. (cf.  and ) The serpent has the ability to speak and to reason: "Now the serpent was more subtle (also translated as "cunning") than any beast of the field which the Lord God had made". There is no indication in the Book of Genesis that the serpent was a deity in its own right, although it is one of only two cases of animals that talk in the Torah (Balaam's donkey being the other).

God placed Adam in the Garden of Eden to tend it and warned Adam not to eat the fruit of the Tree of Knowledge of Good and Evil, "for in the day that thou eatest thereof thou shalt surely die." The serpent tempts Eve to eat of the tree, but Eve tells the serpent what God had said. The serpent replies that she would not surely die and that if she eats the fruit of the tree "then your eyes shall be opened, and ye shall be as gods, knowing good and evil." Eve ate the fruit, and gave some to Adam who also ate. God, who was walking in the Garden, learns of their transgression. To prevent Adam and Eve from eating the fruit of the Tree of Life and living forever, they are banished from the garden upon which God posts an angelic guard. The serpent is punished for its role in the Fall, being cursed by God to crawl on its belly and eat dust.

There is a debate about whether the serpent in Eden should be viewed figuratively or as a literal animal. According to one midrashic interpretation in Rabbinic literature, the serpent represents sexual desire; another interpretation is that the snake is the yetzer hara. Modern Rabbinic ideas include interpreting the story as a psychological allegory where Adam represents reasoning faculties, Eve the emotional faculties, and the serpent the hedonic sexual/physical faculties. Voltaire, drawing on Socinian influences, wrote: "It was so decidedly a real serpent, that all its species, which had before walked on their feet, were condemned to crawl on their bellies. No serpent, no animal of any kind, is called Satan, or Belzebub, or Devil, in the Pentateuch."

20th-century scholars such as W. O. E. Oesterley (1921) were cognizant of the differences between the role of the Edenic serpent in the Hebrew Bible and its connections with the "ancient serpent" in the New Testament. Modern historiographers of Satan such as Henry Ansgar Kelly (2006) and Wray and Mobley (2007) speak of the "evolution of Satan", or "development of Satan".

According to Gerhard von Rad, Old Testament scholar, Lutheran theologian and University of Heidelberg professor, who applied form criticism as a supplement to the documentary hypothesis of the Hebrew Bible, the snake in the Eden's narrative was more an expedient to represent the impulse to temptation of mankind (that is, disobeying God's law) rather than an evil spirit or the personification of the Devil, as the later Christian literature erroneously depicted it; moreover, von Rad himself states that the snake is neither a supernatural being nor a demon, but one of the wild animals created by God, and the only thing that differentiates it from the others in Eden is the ability to speak:

Moses and Aaron
In , Moses asked God how to respond to such doubt, and God asked him to cast the rod which he carried (possibly a shepherd's crook)  onto the ground, whereupon it became a serpent (a nachash). Moses fled from it, but God encouraged him to come back and take it by the tail, and it became a rod again.

Later in the Book of Exodus (Exodus 7), the staffs of Moses and Aaron were turned into serpents, a nachash for Moses, a tanniyn for Aaron.

Fiery serpents

"Fiery serpent" ( sārāf; "burning") occurs in the Torah to describe a species of vicious snakes whose venom burns upon contact. According to Wilhelm Gesenius, saraph corresponds to the Sanskrit Sarpa (Jawl aqra), serpent; sarpin, reptile (from the root srip, serpere). These "burning serpents"(YLT) infested the great and terrible place of the desert wilderness (Num.21:4-9; Deut.8:15). The Hebrew word for "poisonous" literally means "fiery", "flaming" or "burning", as the burning sensation of a snake bite on human skin, a metaphor for the fiery anger of God (Numbers 11:1).

The Book of Isaiah expounds on the description of these fiery serpents as "flying saraphs"(YLT), or "flying dragons", in the land of trouble and anguish (Isaiah 30:6). Isaiah indicates that these saraphs are comparable to vipers,(YLT) worse than ordinary serpents (Isaiah 14:29). The prophet Isaiah also sees a vision of seraphim in the Temple itself: but these are divine agents, with wings and human faces, and are probably not to be interpreted as serpent-like so much as "flame-like".

Serpent of bronze

In the Book of Numbers, while Moses was in the wilderness, he mounted a serpent of bronze on a pole that functioned as a cure against the bite of the "seraphim", the "burning ones". The phrase in Numbers 21:9, "a serpent of bronze," is a wordplay as "serpent" (nehash) and “bronze” (nehoshet) are closely related in Hebrew, nehash nehoshet.

Mainstream scholars suggest that the image of the fiery serpent served to function like that of a magical amulet. Magic amulets or charms were used in the ancient Near East to practice a healing ritual known as sympathetic magic in an attempt to ward off, heal or reduce the impact of illness and poisons. Copper and bronze serpent figures have been recovered, showing that the practice was widespread. A Christian interpretation would be that the bronze serpent served as a symbol for each individual Israelite to take their confession of sin and the need for God's deliverance to heart. Confession of sin and forgiveness was both a community and an individual responsibility. The plague of serpents remained an ongoing threat to the community and the raised bronze serpent was an ongoing reminder to each individual for the need to turn to the healing power of God. It has also been proposed that the bronze serpent was a type of intermediary between God and the people that served as a test of obedience, in the form of free judgment, standing between the dead who were not willing to look to God's chosen instrument of healing, and the living who were willing and were healed. Thus, this instrument bore witness to the sovereign power of Yahweh even over the dangerous and sinister character of the desert.

In , a bronze serpent, alleged to be the one Moses made, was kept in Jerusalem's Temple sanctuary. The Israelites began to worship the object as an idol or image of God, by offering sacrifices and burning incense to it, until Hezekiah was made King. Hezekiah referred to it as Nehushtan and had torn it down. Scholars have debated the nature of the relationship between the Mosaic bronze serpent and Hezekiah's Nehushtan, but traditions happen to link the two.

New Testament

Gospels
In the Gospel of Matthew, John the Baptist calls the Pharisees and Saducees, who were visiting him, a "brood of vipers". Jesus also uses this imagery, observing: "Ye serpents, ye generation of vipers, how can ye escape the damnation of hell?". Alternatively, Jesus also presents the snake with a less negative connotation when sending out the Twelve Apostles. Jesus exhorted them, "Behold, I send you forth as sheep in the midst of wolves: be ye therefore wise as serpents, and harmless as doves". Wilhelm Gesenius notes that even amongst the ancient Hebrews, the serpent was a symbol of wisdom.

In the Gospel of John, Jesus made mention of the Mosaic serpent when he foretold his crucifixion to a Jewish teacher. Jesus compared the act of raising up the Mosaic serpent on a pole, with the raising up of the Son of Man on a cross.

Temptation of Christ
In the temptation of Christ, the Devil cites , "for it is written, He shall give his angels charge concerning thee: and in [their] hands they shall bear thee up, lest at any time thou dash thy foot against a stone." He cuts off before verse 13, "Thou shalt tread upon the lion and adder: the young lion and the dragon (tanniyn) shalt thou trample under feet."Whittaker, H.A. Studies in the Gospels "Matthew 4" Biblia, Cannock 1996

The serpent in Psalm 91:13 is identified as Satan by Christians: "super aspidem et basiliscum calcabis conculcabis leonem et draconem" in the Latin Vulgate, literally "The asp and the basilisk you will trample under foot; you will tread on the lion and the dragon". This passage is commonly interpreted by Christians as a reference to Christ defeating and triumphing over Satan. The passage led to the Late Antique and Early Medieval iconography of Christ treading on the beasts, in which two beasts are often shown, usually the lion and snake or dragon, and sometimes four, which are normally the lion, dragon, asp (snake) and basilisk (which was depicted with varying characteristics) of the Vulgate. All represented the devil, as explained by Cassiodorus and Bede in their commentaries on Psalm 91. The serpent is often shown curled round the foot of the cross in depictions of the crucifixion of Jesus from Carolingian art until about the 13th century; often it is shown as dead. The crucifixion was regarded as the fulfillment of God's curse on the serpent in Genesis 3:15. Sometimes it is pierced by the cross and in one ivory is biting Christ's heel, as in the curse.

Ancient serpent
Serpent (Trans: Ophis, ; "snake", "serpent") occurs in the Book of Revelation as the "ancient serpent" or "old serpent"(YLT) used to describe "the dragon",[20:2] Satan the Adversary,(YLT) who is the devil.[12:9, 20:2] This serpent is depicted as a red seven-headed dragon having ten horns, each housed with a diadem. The serpent battles Michael the Archangel in a War in Heaven which results in this devil being cast out to the earth. While on earth, he pursues the Woman of the Apocalypse. Unable to obtain her, he wages war with the rest of her seed (Revelation 12:1-18). He who has the key to the abyss and a great chain over his hand, binds the serpent for a thousand years. The serpent is then cast into the abyss and sealed within until he is released (Revelation 20:1-3).

In Christian tradition, the "ancient serpent" is commonly identified with the Genesis serpent and as Satan. This identification redefined the Hebrew Bible's concept of Satan ("the Adversary", a member of the Heavenly Court acting on behalf of God to test Job's faith), so that Satan/Serpent became a part of a divine plan stretching from Creation to Christ and the Second Coming.

Religious views
Biblical apocrypha and deuterocanonical books 
The first deuterocanonical source to connect the serpent with the devil may be Wisdom of Solomon. The subject is more developed in the pseudepigraphal-apocryphal Apocalypse of Moses (Vita Adae et Evae) where the devil works with the serpent.

Christianity
In Christianity, a connection between the Serpent and Satan is created, and  where God curses the serpent, is seen in that light: "And the LORD God said unto the serpent, Because thou hast done this, thou art cursed above all cattle, and above every beast of the field; upon thy belly shalt thou go, and dust shalt thou eat all the days of thy life / And I will put enmity between thee and the woman, and between thy seed and her seed; it shall bruise thy head, and thou shalt bruise his heel" (KJV).

Following the imagery of chapter 12 of the Book of Revelation, Bernard of Clairvaux had called Mary the "conqueror of dragons", and she was long to be shown crushing a snake underfoot, also a reference to her title as the "New Eve".

Gnosticism

Gnosticism originated in the late 1st century CE in non-rabbinical Jewish and early Christian sects. In the formation of Christianity, various sectarian groups, labeled "gnostics" by their opponents, emphasised spiritual knowledge (gnosis) of the divine spark within, over faith (pistis) in the teachings and traditions of the various communities of Christians. Gnosticism presents a distinction between the highest, unknowable God, and the Demiurge, "creator" of the material universe. The Gnostics considered the most essential part of the process of salvation to be this personal knowledge, in contrast to faith as an outlook in their worldview along with faith in the ecclesiastical authority.

In Gnosticism, the biblical serpent in the Garden of Eden was praised and thanked for bringing knowledge (gnosis'') to Adam and Eve and thereby freeing them from the malevolent Demiurge's control. Gnostic Christian doctrines rely on a dualistic cosmology that implies the eternal conflict between good and evil, and a conception of the serpent as the liberating savior and bestower of knowledge to humankind opposed to the Demiurge or creator god, identified with the Hebrew God of the Old Testament. Gnostic Christians considered the Hebrew God of the Old Testament as the evil, false god and creator of the material universe, and the Unknown God of the Gospel, the father of Jesus Christ and creator of the spiritual world, as the true, good God. In the Archontic, Sethian, and Ophite systems, Yaldabaoth (Yahweh) is regarded as the malevolent Demiurge and false god of the Old Testament who generated the material universe and keeps the souls trapped in physical bodies, imprisoned in the world full of pain and suffering that he created.

However, not all Gnostic movements regarded the creator of the material universe as inherently evil or malevolent. For instance, Valentinians believed that the Demiurge is merely an ignorant and incompetent creator, trying to fashion the world as good as he can, but lacking the proper power to maintain its goodness. All Gnostics were regarded as heretics by the proto-orthodox Early Church Fathers.

See also

 Aaron's rod
 Caduceus–Staff of Mercury and staff of Hermes
 Caduceus as a symbol of medicine
 Church of God with Signs Following
 Ethnoherpetology
 Lucifer
 Naassenes
 Nāga
 Narayana
 Ningishzida
 Ophites
 Protoevangelium
 Rod of Asclepius
 Serpent seed
 Snake worship
 Staff of Moses

References

Further reading

External links 
 

 
Adam and Eve
Animals in the Bible
Bereshit (parashah)
Christian mythology
Dragons
Garden of Eden
Gnosticism
Jewish mythology
Judeo-Christian topics
Legendary serpents
Satan
Snakes in religion
Talking animals in mythology